HeartBeat is an American medical drama television series that premiered on ABC on March 23, 1988, and ran for two seasons.

Plot
HeartBeat follows the staff of Women's Medical Arts, a medical center founded by three women who are frustrated with how women's health concerns are addressed in the male-dominated medical field.

Cast and characters

Main
 Kate Mulgrew as Dr. Joanne Springsteen/Halloran, co-founder of the clinic (the character's name was changed from Springsteen to Halloran in season 2)
 Laura Johnson as Dr. Eve Autrey/Calvert, co-founder of the clinic (the character's name was changed from Autrey to Calvert in season 2)
 Gail Strickland as Nurse Marilyn McGrath, a nurse practitioner and co-founder of the clinic
 Lynn Whitfield as Dr. Cory Banks
 Ben Masters as Dr. Leo Rosetti
 Darrell Larson as Dr. Paul Jared
 Julie Ronnie as Nurse Alice Swanson

Recurring
 Gina Hecht as Patty, long-term partner of Marilyn McGrath

Development and production
The fictional Women's Medical Arts clinic was based on the Santa Monica Women's Clinic in Santa Monica, California. Dr. Karen Blanchard (OBGYN), the clinic's founder, served as a model for the character played by Kate Mulgrew.

Groundbreaking lesbian content
HeartBeat was the first prime time television series in the United States to feature a  recurring lesbian couple on prime-time, and a lesbian as a main character, Marilyn McGrath; she had a partner Patty, in a long-term lesbian relationship. The show won GLAAD’s first Media Award for Outstanding Drama Series in 1990, which it shared with L.A. Law.
However, in his autobiography, Aaron Spelling stated that ABC demanded a scene in which Marilyn dances with Patty be cut.

Release

Broadcast
HeartBeat debuted on Wednesday, March 23, 1988, at 9 p.m. (Eastern) as a special two-hour pilot; moving to its regular broadcast time of 10 p.m. the following week. For the second season, the schedule was changed to Thursday at 10:00 p.m. This programming made it compete with L.A. Law, one of the most popular series at the time. HeartBeat did not perform well in the ratings and was canceled at the end of its second season. The series finale aired on April 6, 1989.

Episodes

Season 1 (1988)

Season 2 (1989)

Reception
HeartBeat is praised by LGBT television historians for its inclusion of Marilyn and Patty as a couple, and for their sexual orientation being treated as a non-issue. However, ABC received criticism because unlike the heterosexual characters, Marilyn and Patty were not permitted to be sexual or physically affectionate with each other. The feminist content and context of HeartBeat have been studied by feminist cultural critics.

Awards and nominations
HeartBeat was nominated for the 1989 People's Choice Award for Favorite New TV Drama.

It received the first-ever GLAAD Media Award for Outstanding Drama Series in 1990 (shared with L.A. Law).

References

Further reading

 
 
 
 
  HeartBeat at TotallyKate.com.

External links
 HeartBeat at the BFI Film & TV Database
 
 
 

1988 American television series debuts
1989 American television series endings
1980s American drama television series
1980s American medical television series
1980s American LGBT-related drama television series
English-language television shows
Lesbian-related television shows
Television shows set in Los Angeles
American Broadcasting Company original programming
Television series by Spelling Television
GLAAD Media Award-winning shows